Mexico competed in the 2019 Pan American Games in Lima, Peru from July 26 to August 11, 2019.

On July 4, 2019, sport shooter Jorge Orozco was named as the country's flag bearer during the opening ceremony.

Medalists

The following Mexican athletes won medals at the games.

|  style="text-align:left; width:78%; vertical-align:top;"|

* – Indicates athlete participated in the preliminaries but not in the final.
|  style="text-align:left; width:22%; vertical-align:top;"|

Competitors
The following is the list of number of competitors (per gender) participating at the games per sport/discipline.

Archery

Men

Women

Mixed

Artistic swimming

Athletics

Men
Track & road events

Key: Q = Qualified for next round based on position in heat; q = Qualified for next round as fastest loser; * = Athlete ran in a preliminary round but not the final

Field events

Key: Q = Qualify for final based on position in group; q = Qualify for final based on position in field without meeting qualifying mark

Women
Track & road events

Key: Q = Qualified for next round based on position in heat; q = Qualified for next round as fastest loser; * = Athlete ran in a preliminary round but not the final

Field events

Key: Q = Qualify for final based on position in group; q = Qualify for final based on position in field without meeting qualifying mark

Badminton

Mexico qualified a team of six badminton athletes (three per gender).

Men

Women

Mixed

Basketball

Mexico qualified a men's team for the five-a-side tournament.

Men's tournament 

Squad

Results

Seventh place match

Final rank: 7th

Basque pelota

Men

Women

Beach volleyball

Mexico qualified four beach volleyball athletes (two men and two women).

Bodybuilding

Mexico qualified a full team of two bodybuilders (one male and one female).

Bowling

Boxing

Mexico qualified six boxers (three men and three women).

Men

Women

Canoeing

Slalom
Mexico qualified a total of five slalom athletes (three men and two women).

Sprint

Men

Qualification Legend: QF = Qualify to final; QS = Qualify to semifinal

Women

Qualification Legend: QF = Qualify to final; QS = Qualify to semifinal

Cycling

BMX
Freestyle

Racing

Mountain biking

Road cycling

Track cycling
Sprint

Keirin

Madison

Pursuit

Omnium

Diving

Men

Women

Equestrian

Mexico qualified a full team of 12 equestrians (four per discipline).

Dressage

Eventing

Jumping

Fencing

Mexico qualified a team of 16 fencers (seven men and nine women).

Men

Women

Field hockey

Mexico qualified a men's and women's team (of 16 athletes each, for a total of 32) by being ranked among the top two nations at the field hockey at the 2018 Central American and Caribbean Games tournaments.

Men's tournament

Preliminary round

Quarter-finals

Fifth to eighth place classification
Cross-overs

Seventh and eighth place

Final rank: 7th

Women's tournament

Squad

Results

Quarter-finals

Fifth to eighth place classification
Cross-overs

Fifth and sixth place

Final rank: 6th

Football

Mexico qualified a men's and women's team (of 18 athletes each, for a total of 36).

Men's tournament

Squad
The 18-man squad was announced on 29 June 2019.
Head coach: Jaime Lozano

Results

Semi-final

Bronze medal match

Final rank

Women's tournament

Squad
The following players were called up for the 2019 Pan American Games.
Head Coach: Christopher Cuellar

Results

Fifth place match

Final rank
5

Golf

Mexico qualified a full team of four golfers (two men and two women).

Gymnastics

Artistic

Men
Team & Individual Qualification

Individual finals

Women
Team & Individual Qualification

Individual finals

Rhythmic

Individual

Group

Trampoline
Mexico qualified a team of three gymnasts in trampoline (two men and one woman).

Handball

Men's tournament

Semifinals

Bronze medal match

Final rank: 4th

Judo

Men

Women

Karate

Kumite (sparring)

Kata (forms)

Modern pentathlon

Racquetball

Mexico qualified seven racquetball athletes (three men and four women).

Men

Women

Roller sports

Artistic

Speed

Rowing

Men

Women

Rugby sevens

Mexico qualified a women's team of 12 athletes, by winning the 2018 RAN Women's Sevens.

Women's tournament

Pool stage

5th-8th classification

Seventh place match

Final rank: 7th

Sailing

Men

Women

Open

Shooting

Men
Pistol and rifle

Women
Pistol and rifle

Mixed

Softball

Mexico qualified a women's team (of 15 athletes) by being ranked in the top five nations at the 2017 Women's Pan American Championships. The men's team (also consisting of 15 athletes) qualified later by also finishing in the top five nations at the 2017 Men's Pan American Championships.

Men's tournament

Semifinals

Final

Final rank:

Women's tournament

Preliminary round

Semifinals

Squash

Men

Women

Mixed

Surfing

Mexico qualified five surfers (two men and three women) in the sport's debut at the Pan American Games.

Artistic

Race

Swimming

Men

Women

Mixed

Table tennis

Men

Women

Mixed

Taekwondo

Kyorugi
Men

Women

Poomsae

Tennis

Men

Women

Mixed

Triathlon

Individual

Mixed relay

Volleyball

Men's tournament

7th–8th place match

Final rank: 7th

Water polo

Men's tournament

Quarterfinals

5–8th place semifinals

Seventh place game

Final rank7th

Women's tournament

Quarterfinals

5th Place match

Final rank6th

Water skiing

Men

Women

Weightlifting

Mexico qualified eight weightlifters (four men and four women).

Men

Women

Wrestling

Men

  Shalom Villegas, from Venezuela, lost the silver medal for a doping violation.

Women

See also
Mexico at the 2020 Summer Olympics

References

Nations at the 2019 Pan American Games
2019
2019 in Mexican sports